The gens Tutilia was a minor plebeian family at ancient Rome.  No members of this gens came to prominence until imperial times, but two of them attained the consulship under the Antonines.

Origin
The nomen Tutilius belongs to a large class of gentilicia originally formed from cognomina ending in the diminutive suffix .  The root of the name is probably either the Latin tutus, "safe", or perhaps the Oscan touto, a people.

Members

 Tutilius, an orator, and the father-in-law of Quintilian.  He was respected as a scholar of rhetoric, but nothing of his own work has survived.
 Tutilia, the wife of Quintilian.
 Lucius Tutilius Lupercus Sulpicius Avitus, a relative of the consul Lupercus Pontianus, named on a sepulchral inscription from Falerii in Etruria, dating from the latter half of the first century.
 Lucius Tutilius Lupercus Pontianus, consul in AD 135, with Publius Calpurnius Atilianus.
 Tutilius Pontianus, either the elder brother or the father of Tutilius Lupercus.
 Tutilius Lupercus, either the younger brother or son of Tutilius Pontianus.
 Lucius Tutilius Pontianus Gentianus, although guilty of adultery with the empress Faustina, his career was nonetheless advanced by Marcus Aurelius.  He was consul suffectus under Commodus, early in AD 183.
 Tutilia L. f. Procula, probably a noblewoman, named on lead pipes from Rome.

See also
 List of Roman gentes

References

Bibliography
 Marcus Fabius Quintilianus (Quintilian), Institutio Oratoria (Institutes of Oratory).
 Marcus Valerius Martialis (Martial), Epigrammata (Epigrams).
 Gaius Plinius Caecilius Secundus (Pliny the Younger), Epistulae (Letters).
 Aelius Lampridius, Aelius Spartianus, Flavius Vopiscus, Julius Capitolinus, Trebellius Pollio, and Vulcatius Gallicanus, Historia Augusta (Lives of the Emperors).
 Dictionary of Greek and Roman Biography and Mythology, William Smith, ed., Little, Brown and Company, Boston (1849).
 Theodor Mommsen et alii, Corpus Inscriptionum Latinarum (The Body of Latin Inscriptions, abbreviated CIL), Berlin-Brandenburgische Akademie der Wissenschaften (1853–present).
 George Davis Chase, "The Origin of Roman Praenomina", in Harvard Studies in Classical Philology, vol. VIII, pp. 103–184 (1897).
 Paul von Rohden, Elimar Klebs, & Hermann Dessau, Prosopographia Imperii Romani (The Prosopography of the Roman Empire, abbreviated PIR), Berlin (1898).

Roman gentes